Johannes Theodorus Hendrikus Jacobus "Jo" Eshuijs (6 February 1885 – 24 November 1979) was a Dutch international footballer who earned one cap for the national side in 1906.

Club career
Eshuijs played club football for Sparta Rotterdam.

International career
He played his only international match on 13 May 1906 against Belgium.

References

External links
 
 Profile at VoetbalStats.nl

1885 births
1979 deaths
People from Asahan Regency
Association football defenders
Dutch footballers
Netherlands international footballers
Sparta Rotterdam players